Cosimo Massimo Fusco (born 23 September 1962) is an Italian actor.

Biography
Born in Matera, Italy, Fusco was educated in Los Angeles, Rome, and Paris. He is best known for his role as Paolo, one of Rachel's boyfriends in the American sitcom Friends. He has had roles in several Italian, German, and American productions, including the films Gone in 60 Seconds, Coco Chanel, Angels & Demons, and The Man Who Invented Christmas. He has appeared in the shows Alias, La piovra, and The Mentalist, among others. He played the role of Judge Alberto Somaschi in the Italian series Il bene e il male from 2008 to 2009.

Selected filmography

Film

Television

Music videos

References

External links

1962 births
People from Matera
Italian male film actors
Italian male television actors
Living people
20th-century Italian male actors
21st-century Italian male actors